Power–speed number or power/speed number (PSN) is a sabermetrics baseball statistic developed by baseball author and analyst Bill James which combines a player's home run and stolen base numbers into one number.

The formula is:

.

(It is the harmonic mean of the two totals.)

Power–speed number is displayed as a number with one digit after the decimal point.

James introduced the power–speed number in his commentary on Bobby Bonds, writing "it is so crafted that a player who does well in both home runs and stolen bases will rate high, and his rating is determined by the balance of the two as well as by the total."

Leaders

The highest single season power–speed number was turned in in 1998 by Alex Rodriguez, then of the Seattle Mariners. Rodriguez hit 42 home runs and stole 46 bases to record a power–speed number of 43.9.

The highest career power–speed number belongs to Barry Bonds. Bonds had 762 career home runs and 514 career stolen bases for a career power–speed number of 613.9. Rickey Henderson is second on the career list at 490.4, followed by Willie Mays (447.1), Alex Rodriguez (446.8), Barry's father Bobby Bonds (386.0), and Joe Morgan (385.9).

The highest active career power-speed numbers as of 2022 belonged to Mike Trout (245.3), Andrew McCutchen (227.8), and Justin Upton (206.0).

References

Batting statistics
Bill James